The mandibular fossa, also known as the glenoid fossa in some dental literature, is the depression in the temporal bone that articulates with the mandible.

Structure 
In the temporal bone, the mandibular fossa is bounded anteriorly by the articular tubercle and posteriorly by the tympanic portion of the temporal bone, which separates it from the external acoustic meatus. The fossa is divided into two parts by a narrow slit, the petrotympanic fissure (Glaserian fissure). It is concave in shape to receive the condyloid process of the mandible.

Development 
The mandibular fossa develops from condylar cartilage. This may be stimulated by SOX9 or ALK2, as has been seen in mouse models.

Function 
The condyloid process of the mandible articulates with the temporal bone of the skull at the mandibular fossa.

Clinical significance 
Problems with morphogenesis during embryonic development can lead to the mandibular fossa not forming. This may be caused by mutations to SOX9 or ALK2.

If the mandibular fossa is very shallow, this can cause problems with the strength of the temporomandibular joint. This can lead to easy subluxation of the joint and trismus (lock jaw). Deformation of the mandibular fossa, often part of temporomandibular dysplasia, causes similar problems in dogs. This may resolve spontaneously, or require surgery.

History 
The mandibular fossa is also known as the glenoid fossa in some dental literature.

Other animals 
The mandibular fossa is a feature of the skulls of various other animals, including dogs.

See also 
 Temporomandibular joint

References

External links 
 
 

Bones of the head and neck